Pacifica: Australasian Theological Studies was a peer-reviewed academic journal that covered the field of theology. It was sponsored and later owned by the University of Divinity (formerly the Melbourne College of Divinity), which engaged SAGE Publications as the journal's publisher from 2013. Pacifica was established in 1988 and ceased publication in 2017.

Abstracting and indexing 
The journal was abstracted and indexed in Academic Search Elite, ATLA Religion Database, New Testament Abstracts, Old Testament Abstracts, and Current Contents.

References

External links 
 

SAGE Publishing academic journals
English-language journals
Christianity studies journals
Triannual journals
Publications established in 1988